Katrnikona Mandal is one of the 22 mandals in  Konaseema district of Andhra Pradesh. As per census 2011, there are 14 villages in this Mandal.

Demographics 
Katrnikona Mandal has total population of 74,819 as per the Census 2011 out of which 37,764 are males while 37,055 are females. The average Sex Ratio of Katrnikona Mandal is 981. The total literacy rate of Katrnikona Mandal is 68%.

Towns and villages

Villages 
1. Bantumilli
2. Brahmasamedyam
3. Cheyyeru
4. Chirrayanam
5. Dontikurru
6. Geddanapalle
7. Kandikuppa
8. Katrenikona
9. Kundaleswaram
10. Lakshmiwada
11. Nadavapalle
12. Pallamkurru
13. Penuwalla
14. Uppudi

See also 
List of mandals in Andhra Pradesh

References 

Mandals in Konaseema district
Mandals in Andhra Pradesh